Ramgoat Cay is an islet in the United States Virgin Islands, located 310 yards northeast of Henley Cay and 1300 feet north of Hawksnest Point on the island of Saint John. It is 30 feet high and located within the Virgin Islands National Park.

See also 
 Islands of the United States Virgin Islands

References 

Islands of the United States Virgin Islands